Galena Park is a city in Harris County, Texas, United States, within the Houston–Sugar Land–Baytown metropolitan area. The population was 10,740 at the 2020 census.

History
Issac Batterson and his family settled in the area in 1833; it was a part of the Ezekiel Thomas survey. The area of Galena Park began as the settlement of Clinton in 1835. The center of what would become Galena Park was a  tract that Batterson purchased from the estate of Ezekiel Thomas. The settlement originally served as a farming and ranching community, but in the 1880s transformed into a railroad center along the new Port of Houston.  With the coming of the petrochemical industry in the early 1900s, Clinton again transformed into a refinery center.

Clinton attempted to establish a post office in 1935, but the request was denied, as another Clinton, Texas, had established the name.  The settlement's name was changed to Galena Park after the Galena Signal Oil Company of Texas, which built the first refinery there.  Galena Park's original name survives today as the name of a major street in the city, Clinton Drive. Because of the 1935 incorporation, Houston did not incorporate Galena Park's territory into its city limits, while Houston annexed surrounding areas that were unincorporated. By the late 1930s Houston was growing as a port, so Galena Park expanded. Since the 1940s, area residents considered the city to be a part of greater Houston.

The economy of Galena Park began to suffer in the early 1980s, when cranes used to haul ship cargo were reduced; prior to the early 1980s, a team of workers, known on the docks as longshoremen, took up to one week to unload cargo off a ship. Many lived in the Galena Park area and contributed to its local economy. The use of cranes, however, led to ships unloading all cargo in less than one day. The 1980s also hit Galena Park's economy with layoffs from the steel mills as the U.S. steel contracted due to overseas competition. The economy further decreased after the September 11, 2001 attacks, when seaport administrators tightened security rules that governed whether sailors could leave ships docked at port.

Geography

Galena Park is located at  (29.738928, –95.237211).

The city is east of the 610 Loop, north of the Houston Ship Channel, and adjacent to the City of Jacinto City, as well as the Clinton Park neighborhood of Houston. Clinton Drive is the main arterial road for Galena Park and traffic to and from the ship channel and the Port of Houston uses this road. The area around Galena Park includes freeways, freight railway, and heavy industry.

The border between Galena Park, previously an all-white city and Clinton Park, an African-American neighborhood, is barricaded as of 2008. Rafael Longoria and Susan Rogers of the Rice Design Alliance said in 2008 that the barricade "provides a stark example of how the prevailing segregationist sentiments of the era [are] still in evidence."

Demographics

As of the 2020 United States census, 10,740 people, 3,019 households, and 2,481 families were residing in the city.

As of the census of 2010,  10,887 people and 3,021 households resided in the city. The population density was 2,183.3 people per square mile (843.0/km2). The 3,273 housing units had an average density of 654.6/sq mi (253.7/km2). The racial makeup of the city was 11.4% White, not Hispanic, 6.6% African American, not Hispanic, 0.13% Native American or Native Alaskan, not Hispanic, 0.09% Asian or Pacific Islander, 0.16% from other races, not Hispanic, and 0.25% from two or more races. People of Hispanic, Latino, or Spanish origin of any race were 81.4% of the population, a 21% increase over the 2000 census.

As of the 2000 census, of the 3,054 households, 46.9% had children under 18 living with them, 61.9% were married couples living together, 13.3% had a female householder with no husband present, and 19.4% were not families. About 17.0% of all households were made up of individuals, and 8.8% had someone living alone who was 65 or older. The average household size was 3.47, and the average family size was 3.92.

In the city, the age distribution was 33.8% under 18, 11.4% from 18 to 24, 28.6% from 25 to 44, 16.2% from 45 to 64, and 9.9% who were 65 or older. The median age was 28 years. For every 100 females, there were 99.1 males. For every 100 females 18 and over, there were 98.5 males.

The median income for a household in the city was $31,660, and for a family was $34,702. Males had a median income of $29,814 versus $21,172 for females. The per capita income for the city was $12,207. About 21.5% of families and 25.4% of the population were below the poverty line, including 34.2% of those under 18 and 10.6% of those 65 or over.

Government and infrastructure

As of 2014, Esmeralda Moya is the mayor of the City of Galena Park. Mayor Moya also serves as the chief executive officer of the city, as the city's chief administrator and official representative. The city made history on June 21, 2014, by electing her as the first female Hispanic to hold this elected position.

The City of Galena Park operates with a mayor-gouncil type of government. The gity council has four positions, with each having a responsibility for a particular municipal department. Commissioner Zenaida Granados, position one, heads water and sewer services. Commissioner Rodney Chersky, position two, heads police and fire services. Commissioner Veronica Garcia, position three, heads parks and recreation. Commissioner Beverly Mullen, position four, heads street and bridge services.

The Galena Park Fire Department and the Galena Park Police Department serve the citizens of the city.

County, federal, and state representation
Galena Park is located within Harris County Precinct 2; as of 2011, Jack Morman headed Precinct 2.

Galena Park is located in District 143 of the Texas House of Representatives As of 2011, Ana Hernandez Luna represented the district. Galena Park is within District 6  of the Texas Senate; as of 2011, Mario Gallegos, Jr. was the representative.

Galena Park was within Texas's 29th congressional district; as of 2019, Sylvia Garcia represented the district. The United States Postal Service operates the Galena Park Post Office at 1805 Clinton Drive.

The designated public health center of the Harris Health System (formerly Harris County Health System) is the Strawberry Health Clinic in Pasadena. The nearest public hospital is Ben Taub General Hospital in the Texas Medical Center, Houston.

Education

Primary and secondary schools

Public schools

Students in Galena Park attend schools in Galena Park Independent School District.

Four separate elementary schools, Galena Park Elementary School in Galena Park, MacArthur Elementary School in Galena Park, Jacinto City Elementary School in Jacinto City, and Pyburn Elementary School in Houston, serve students from the city of Galena Park Almost all Galena Park students are zoned to Galena Park Middle School (6–8) in Galena Park. A few in northeast Galena Park are zoned to Woodland Acres Middle School in Houston. All Galena Park residents are zoned to Galena Park High School (9–12) in Galena Park.

In addition, GPISD operates the William F. "Bill" Becker Early Childhood Development Center, a preschool program for low-income families, in Galena Park.

In the pre-1970 era of racial segregation in schools, the local high school for Black children was Fidelity Manor High School.

Private schools

Our Lady of Fatima School, a prekindergarten to grade 8 Roman Catholic school, is in Galena Park. The school is fully accredited by TEA and TCEA. It has served the community for over 60 years and is open in enrollment to all faiths and denominations.

Colleges and universities

The Galena Park ISD area (and therefore Galena Park) is zoned to the San Jacinto College system.

Public libraries

The Harris County Public Library (HCPL) system operates the Galena Park Branch at 1500 Keene Street in Galena Park. The  branch, a partnership between HCPL and Galena Park, was built in March 1996, and opened in December of that year.

Gallery of schools

Notable people
 Michael Glyn Brown, former hand surgeon
Howard Twilley, professional football player

Gallery

See also

References

External links

 City of Galena Park official website

Cities in Texas
Cities in Harris County, Texas
Greater Houston